St. Vartanants Martyrs Church is the Armenian Apostolic Church in the Malatia-Sebastia District of Yerevan, the capital of Armenia. It is located on the Yerablur hill, right of the Yerevan-Echmiadzin highway. 

On the day of Saint Vartanants, the Armenian Apostolic Church holds a liturgy in the church.

The church is located next to the Yerablur Military Pantheon. Various Armenian officials visit the church to honor the memory of the fallen Armenian soldiers.

History 
The construction of St. Vardanants Martyrs Church in Yerablur began in 1994 on the initiative of Catholicos of All Armenians Karekin I and Vazgen Sargsyan. The sponsors of the construction of the church are the Armenian Americans Hrach and Victoria Voskanyan. The church was consecrated in 1998 by Archbishop Garegin Nersisyan.

Gradually, a community formed around the church, consisting of the parents of the killed Armenian and Artsakh soldiers, whose graves are buried in the Yerablur Military Pantheon. By order of the Catholicos of All Armenians in the church every Sunday on the Feast of Tabernacles, on the Days of the Dead, on the feasts of St. Vardanants and St. Sarkis, the sacred liturgy is celebrated.

Gallery

See also 
 St. Vartanants Church

References

External links 

Churches in Yerevan
Armenian Apostolic churches
War monuments and memorials
Martyrs' monuments and memorials
Buildings and structures completed in 1998